Loch Buidhe is a fresh water loch on Rannoch Moor, Argyll and Bute within Highland council area, Scotland.

It lies to the south of Lochan na Stainge, and to the west of Lochan na h-Achlaise. The A82 road crosses Rannoch Moor to the west of the loch, while the West Highland Way long-distance path passes by to the west.
The name is Gaelic for yellow loch.

References

Buidhe
Buidhe
Tay catchment
Lochaber